The 2022 California Golden Bears baseball team represents the University of California, Berkeley in the 2022 NCAA Division I baseball season. The Golden Bears play their home games at Evans Diamond as a member of the Pac-12 Conference. They are led by head coach Mike Neu, in his 5th season at Cal.

Previous season

The Golden Bears finished with a record of 29–26, and 15–15 in conference play. The Golden Bears were not selected to compete in the 2021 NCAA Division I baseball tournament.

Personnel

Roster

Coaches

Schedule

|-
! colspan=2 style=""| Regular Season: 19–20 (Home: 8–13; Away: 8–6; Neutral: 3–1)
|- valign="top"
|

|-
|

|-
|

|-
|

|- 
|- style="text-align:center;"
|   
|}

Source:

Rankings

References

External links 
 California Golden Bears baseball

California Golden Bears baseball team, 2022
California Golden Bears baseball seasons
California Golden Bears baseball